Cinematography in Galicia is in the main in Galician language, although there is also a minority done in Spanish and Portuguese.

History

Until the Civil War
After the arrival to Galicia of the first film projectors, there were some pioneers that carried out filmings. It is the case of authors as Xosé Gil (Miss Ledyia, 1916) or José Signo (La tragedia de Xirobio, 1930). In those years also Spanish films set in the Galicia as La Casa de la Troya are filmed and also works of foreign directors as Carmiña, flower of Galicia carried out by the Italian Rino Lupo although the interiors were carried out in Porto, appear.

Civil War – 1975
There are documentaries of the emigration and of the exile (rescued some of them at the end of the 20th century). The more distinguished figure is Carlos Velo (1909–1988). Before being exiled during the Spanish Civil War, he made documentary shorts for afterwards pass to Mexico where they consider him a director of Mexican cinema. In the eighties it was a center of mass of tributes and considered a pioneer. Some of his titles are Torero, 1956 and Pedro Páramo, 1967.

1975 –  present
The importance of the fiction in television can be noticed by the economic development that some of the companies of production acquire through series. Unfortunately the economic strength does not mean that the production reflects a line of creation towards a cinema (or in this audio-visual case) characteristic of Galicia, stereotyped products, which they escape of any type of incorrect aspect, take place frequently -as it happens in most of the commercial televisions of the world-, and they follow an interchangeable model to any place of the world.

Among the films done in Galicia it is remarkable for the quantity of people that it saw O bosque animado of 2001 (Dygra Films), according to data of the ICAA it was seen by 509.132 spectators (05/10/2004). Several other animated films have been produced in the region. 

The Blind Sunflowers (film) was filmed in Ourense. Lost in Galicia also features the region.

Cinema of Spain
Galician culture
Celtic films